Manfred Klieme (born 3 February 1936) is a former East German racing cyclist, who won a silver medal at the 1960 Summer Olympics in Rome.

He was born in Berlin.

Klieme competed for the SC Dynamo Berlin / Sportvereinigung (SV) Dynamo.

References 

1936 births
Living people
German track cyclists
German male cyclists
Olympic cyclists of the United Team of Germany
Olympic silver medalists for the United Team of Germany
Cyclists at the 1960 Summer Olympics
Cyclists from Berlin
Olympic medalists in cycling
Medalists at the 1960 Summer Olympics